Ranvijay Singh Judev is a Bharatiya Janata Party (BJP) politician. He was a Member of Parliament, representing Chhattisgarh in the Rajya Sabha the upper house of Indian Parliament. He belongs to the royal family of former Jashpur State and current titular Maharaja of Jashpur. He is nephew of former union minister Dilip Singh Judeo.

References

External links
Ranvijay Singh Judev - Rajya Sabha Profile

1969 births
Bharatiya Janata Party politicians from Chhattisgarh
Living people
People from Jashpur district
Rajya Sabha members from Chhattisgarh